Lucas Stephen Grabeel (born November 23, 1984) is an American actor, singer, and songwriter. He is best known for his role as Ryan Evans in the High School Musical film series (2006–2008). His other film appearances include Halloweentown High (2004), Return to Halloweentown (2006), Alice Upside Down (2007), and The Adventures of Food Boy (2008). He appeared as a young Lex Luthor and Conner Kent in the television series Smallville (2006–2011).

In 2011, Grabeel released his debut extended play, Sunshine. He went on to play Toby Kennish in the ABC Freeform drama series Switched at Birth (2011–2017). He also provided the voice of Deputy Peck in the Disney Junior television series Sheriff Callie's Wild West (2014–2017) and the title character in the Netflix series Pinky Malinky (2019).

Early life
Grabeel was born in Springfield, Missouri on November 23, 1984, the son of Jean and Stephen Grabeel. Before transferring to and graduating from Kickapoo High School in Springfield in 2003, he attended Logan-Rogersville Elementary, Middle and High School. He also played drums for a local church and initiated a men's a cappella singing group at Kickapoo called No Treble. At school, he found passions in the guitar and the accordion while also enjoying dance. While in Rogersville, Missouri, he regularly attended Harmony Baptist Church, where he was a part of the children's and youth groups.

Career

2004–08: Beginning and High School Musical

In 2004, he starred in his first film role as Ethan Dolloway in the third installment of the Halloweentown series Halloweentown High. He reprised this role in the series' fourth installment Return to Halloweentown. Grabeel has made television guest appearances in TV series such as Boston Legal, 'Til Death, and Veronica Mars. On Smallville, he portrayed a young Lex Luthor. In 2006, he was cast in the role of Ryan Evans, the fraternal twin brother of Sharpay Evans (played by Ashley Tisdale), in the Disney movie High School Musical. He reprised his role in the television sequels High School Musical 2 and High School Musical 3: Senior Year. In 2007, he joined co-stars Vanessa Hudgens, Ashley Tisdale, Corbin Bleu and Monique Coleman on the 51-date High School Musical: The Concert. In early 2009, Billboard believed that Grabeel and Tisdale's track "I Want It All" should be nominated for an Oscar in the Best Original Song category however, the song did not make the final shortlist. During his time in High School Musical, Grabeel (along with his co-stars) had a total of six tracks chart in the Billboard Hot 100.

He was the first artist to debut in the Billboard Hot 100 with two simultaneous new entries in one week. While with Disney Channel, Grabeel also participated in the first ever Disney Channel Games and co-captained the green team along with Ashley Tisdale, Mitchel Musso, Miley Cyrus, Emily Osment and Kyle Massey. A year later, he returned to repeat his captaincy of the green team with Dylan Sprouse, Miley Cyrus, Monique Coleman and Brandon Baker. Other film projects Grabeel was involved with include the animated film, At Jesus' Side, where he voiced a dog named Jericho. He also filmed the independent film, Alice Upside Down, as the character of Lester McKinley, based on the "Alice book series" by Phyllis Reynolds Naylor. Aside his involvement in the High School Musical soundtracks, Grabeel has recorded a song called "You Know I Will" for the soundtrack of The Fox and the Hound 2 and also recorded his own version of the Michael Bolton track "Go the Distance", from Disney's Hercules, for DisneyMania 5.

In 2007, Grabeel co-wrote and recorded a song called "You Got It" which was released in the iTunes Store on August 19, 2007 while its accompanying music video was released on his official website. Grabeel also recorded another original song called "Trash Talkin'" which was released November 15, 2008 on YouTube. In 2008, he also appeared in the movie Milk, a biopic about the slain gay rights activist Harvey Milk. Grabeel played a friend and supporter of Milk, photographer Danny Nicoletta. He also appeared in the 2008 Walt Disney Pictures film College Road Trip as Scooter, which features other Disney stars Raven-Symoné, Brenda Song and Margo Harshman. He also stars in the independent movie Lock and Roll Forever alongside Oreskaband. Grabeel also guest starred in an episode of The Cleveland Show.

2009–present: Switched at Birth and other projects
Early in 2009, Grabeel was voted Most Likely to Do Big Things in 2009 by MTV and had an exclusive interview with them. He mentions the release of another music video for his track Get Your Ass On. He also mentioned his latest movie project, The Legend of the Dancing Ninja, where he played the lead Tokyo Jones alongside David Hasselhoff. In May 2009 he portrayed the role on stage of Matt in the Harvey Schmidt and Tom Jones musical, The Fantasticks with Eric McCormack and Harry Groener at UCLA's Freud Playhouse. Grabeel also sings in the iTunes show I Kissed a Vampire, in which, he stars. In early 2009, he appeared at the Southland Theatre Artists Goodwill Event (S.T.A.G.E.), an AIDS charity event, in Beverly Hills performing George and Ira Gershwin's "I Can't Be Bothered Now". He also recorded and released a new track titled '135n8' in early 2014 with the music video being uploaded to his YouTube account.

In 2011 he appeared in the 10th season of Smallville as Alexander Luthor / Connor Kent, a hybrid clone with Lex Luthor and Clark Kent's DNA. In 2007, he filmed the movie, The Adventures of Food Boy with Brittany Curran, as the lead, Ezra Chase. Since the summer of 2011, Grabeel has been starring in the ABC Family drama Switched at Birth, in which he plays the brother of one of the two girls that were mistakenly switched at birth in the hospital. In March 2012, I Kissed A Vampire was released in the US, where Lucas stars alongside Drew Seeley and Adrian Slade. In January 2014 he provided his first-ever voice over role for an animated series, Deputy Peck on Sheriff Callie's Wild West. He has also played the character of Gustav in Dragons: Defenders of Berk. In 2019, Grabeel appeared in High School Musical: The Musical: The Series as himself.

Other ventures
In 2007, Grabeel founded a production company called 14341 Productions. His role within involves overseeing many projects from writing to directing and executive producing. The company has produced projects such as the short films The Real Son, Smoke Break; the music videos for "Get Your Ass On" and "You Got It". They produced a television pilot called Regarding Beauregard which was Grabeel's directorial debut. They also created a 17-minute short film, Chuckle Boy, as well as a short film called The Dragon in 2009. Their work debuted at the 2009 Sundance Film Festival.

Filmography

Film

Television

Discography

Extended play

Singles
As main artist

As featured artist

Other appearances

Other charted songs

Awards and nominations

Notes

References

External links

 

1984 births
Living people
21st-century American male actors
21st-century American male singers
21st-century American singers
American male dancers
American male film actors
American male musical theatre actors
American male singers
American male television actors
American male voice actors
Male actors from Missouri
Musicians from Springfield, Missouri
People from Rogersville, Missouri
Singers from Missouri